Boy van Poppel (born 18 January 1988) is a Dutch professional road racing cyclist, who currently rides for UCI WorldTeam . He is the son of former cyclists Jean-Paul van Poppel and Leontine van der Lienden.

Professional career
On 12 September 2008, Utrecht-born van Poppel made a name for himself at the Tour of Missouri, winning the fifth stage. With that victory, he handed Mark Cavendish his first 'defeat' in a bunch sprint since the Giro d'Italia held in May. In the 2012 Tour of Britain, van Poppel finished consistently in the top ten in numerous stages, which helped him secure the Points Classification jersey before second-placed Mark Cavendish.

Van Poppel joined  for the 2014 season, after his previous team –  – folded at the end of the 2013 season. He was named in the start list for the 2015 Vuelta a España.

Major results

Cyclo-cross

2004–2005
 1st  National Junior Championships
 3rd Junior Koksijde
2005–2006
 1st  UCI World Junior Championships
 1st  National Junior Championships
 Junior Superprestige
1st Gieten
1st Hoogstraten
2nd Vorselaar
 1st Junior Lille
 1st Junior Loenhout
 1st Junior Overijse
 3rd Overall UCI Junior World Cup
2nd Hooglede-Gits
2nd Liévin
2nd Hoogerheide
 2nd Junior Essen
 2nd Junior Hofstade
 2nd Junior Oostmalle
2006–2007
 3rd National Under-23 Championships
 3rd Under-23 Pijnacker
2007–2008
 1st  National Under-23 Championships
 Under-23 Gazet van Antwerpen
1st Loenhout
2008–2009
 1st  National Under-23 Championships

Road

2006
 2nd Road race, National Junior Championships
 10th Road race, UEC European Junior Championships
2008
 1st Stage 5 Tour of Missouri
 9th Omloop van het Waasland
 9th Ronde van Overijssel
2009
 1st Stage 3 Tour de Normandie
 1st Prologue (TTT) Olympia's Tour
 2nd Schaal Sels
 3rd Road race, National Under-23 Championships
 8th Antwerpse Havenpijl
 9th Omloop van het Waasland
2010
 1st Stage 4 Kreiz Breizh Elites
 5th Châteauroux Classic
 6th Zellik–Galmaarden
 10th Dwars door Drenthe
2011
 5th Overall Ronde van Drenthe
2012
 3rd Nokere Koerse
 7th Overall Tour of Britain
1st  Points classification
 8th Handzame Classic
2013
 6th Vattenfall Cyclassics
 6th Amstel Curaçao Race
2014
 8th Halle–Ingooigem
2017
 9th Overall Three Days of De Panne
2018
 7th Grand Prix de Fourmies
 7th Omloop van het Houtland
2019
 3rd Grand Prix de Fourmies
 4th Nokere Koerse
 5th Ronde van Limburg
2021
 5th Road race, National Championships
 7th Dwars door het Hageland
 7th Heistse Pijl
 8th Ronde van Limburg

Grand Tour general classification results timeline

References

External links

Boy van Poppel's profile on Cycling Base

1988 births
Living people
Dutch male cyclists
Sportspeople from Utrecht (city)
UCI Road World Championships cyclists for the Netherlands
Cyclo-cross cyclists
Cyclists from Utrecht (province)